Emanuel Alston House is a historic home located on Saint Helena Island near Frogmore, Beaufort County, South Carolina. It was built about 1915, and is a rectangular one-story, vernacular frame dwelling on a brick foundation, with a metal hipped roof. The front façade features a full-width porch, with a low hipped roof. A shed or hipped roof dormer located on the front roof slope provides light and ventilation to the attic space.

It was listed in the National Register of Historic Places in 1988.

References

Houses on the National Register of Historic Places in South Carolina
Houses completed in 1915
Houses in Beaufort County, South Carolina
National Register of Historic Places in Beaufort County, South Carolina